This is a list of Members of Parliament (MPs) elected at the 1895 general election, held over several days from 13 July to 7 August 1895.



By-elections

1895
22 August: Cavan West - James Patrick Farrell, Anti-Parnellite, replacing Edmund Francis Vesey Knox
31 August: Inverness Burghs - Sir Robert Finlay QC, Liberal, replacing Gilbert Beith
5 September: Kerry South - Thomas Joseph Farrell, Anti-Parnellite, replacing
11 September: Limerick - Francis Arthur O'Keefe, Anti-Parnellite, replacing
12 September: Waterford West - James John O'Shee, Anti-Parnellite, replacing
28 November: Kensington South - The Earl Percy, Conservative, replacing
29 November: Liverpool East Toxteth - Augustus Frederick Warr, Conservative, replacing
6 December: Dublin University - Rt Hon William Lecky, Unionist, replacing David Plunket, Irish Unionist

1896
22 January: Belfast North - Sir James Horner Haslett, Ulster Unionist, replacing Edward Harland, Ulster Unionist
28 January: St Pancras South - Capt Herbert Jessel, Unionist, replacing
30 January: Brixton - Hon Evelyn Hubbard, Conservative, replacing Marquess of Carmarthen
21 February: Wycombe - Viscount Curzon, Conservative, replacing
22 February: Southampton - Sir Francis Evans KCMG, Liberal, replacing
26 February: Lichfield - Courtenay Warner, Liberal, replacing
19 March: Louth South - Richard McGhee (Irish National Federation) replacing Dr Daniel Ambrose (Irish National Federation) who died 17 December 1895
27 March: Kerry East - The Hon James Burke Roche (Irish National Federation) replacing Michael Davitt (Irish National Federation) who had been elected for two seats and chose to sit for Mayo South
6 April: Dublin College Green - James Laurence Carew, Parnellite, replacing J. E. Kenny Parnellite
24 April: Kerry North - Michael Joseph Flavin (Irish National Federation) replacing Thomas Sexton (Irish National Federation) who had resigned
1 May: Aberdeen North- Duncan Pirie, Liberal replacing William Hunter, Liberal
12 May: Edinburgh & St Andrews Universities - Sir William Overend Priestley, Conservative, replacing
 2 June: Wick Burghs - Thomas Hedderwick, Liberal, replacing Sir John Pender
 2 June: Frome - John Barlow, Liberal, replacing
10 November: Bradford East - Capt Hon Ronald Greville, Conservative, replacing Henry Byron Reed

1897
12 January: Cleveland - Alfred Pease, Liberal, replacing Henry Fell Pease
30 January: Forfarshire - Capt John Sinclair, Liberal, replacing Martin White
1 February: Romford - Louis Sinclair, Conservative, replacing Alfred Wigram
 3 February: Walthamstow - Sam Woods, Liberal (Lib-Lab), replacing Edmund Widdrington Byrne
15 February: Glasgow Bridgeton - Sir Charles Cameron Bt, Liberal replacing Sir George Trevelyan, Liberal
18 February: Chertsey - Henry Leigh-Bennett, Conservative, replacing Charles Harvey Combe
 3 March: Halifax - Alfred Billson, Liberal, replacing William Rawson Shaw
 8 June: Petersfield - William Graham Nicholson, Conservative, replacing William Wickham
15 July: Roscommon South - John Patrick Hayden, Parnellite, replacing Luke Hayden
 6 August: Sheffield Brightside - Frederick Maddison, Liberal, replacing A. J. Mundella
28 September: Denbighshire East - Samuel Moss, Liberal, replacing George Osborne Morgan
28 October: Barnsley - Joseph Walton, Liberal, replacing William Compton, Liberal
 4 November: Middleton - Ald James Duckworth, Liberal, replacing Thomas Fielden
10 November: Liverpool Exchange - Charles McArthur, Unionist, replacing John Bigham

1898
12 January: Plymouth - Sigismund Mendl, Liberal, replacing
13 January: York - Rear Adm Lord Charles Beresford CB, Conservative, replacing
21 January: Mid Armagh - Dunbar Barton QC, Conservative, reelected
21 January: Dublin St Stephen's Green - James Campbell QC, Conservative, replacing
 3 February: Marylebone West - Sir Samuel E. Scott Bt, Conservative, replacing
 3 February: Wolverhampton South - John Lloyd Gibbons, Unionist, replacing Charles Pelham Villiers
15 February: Pembrokeshire - John Wynford Philipps, Liberal, replacing
15 February: Edgbaston - Francis William Lowe, Conservative, replacing
24 February: Cricklade - Edmund Fitzmaurice, Liberal, replacing Alfred Hopkinson
 9 March: Stepney - W. C. Steadman, Liberal (Lib-Lab), replacing
26 March: Maidstone - Fiennes Cornwallis, Conservative, replacing
30 March: Wokingham - Comm Oliver Young RN, Conservative, replacing
10 May: Newark - Viscount Newark, Conservative, replacing
10 May: Staffordshire West - Alexander Henderson, Unionist, replacing
12 May: Norfolk South - Arthur W. Soames, Liberal, replacing
22 June: Hertford - Evelyn Cecil, Conservative, replacing
13 July: Gravesend - John H Dudley Ryder, Conservative, replacing
18 July: Down West - Capt Arthur Hill, Conservative, replacing
25 July: Reading - George William Palmer, Liberal, replacing
 2 August: Great Grimsby - George Doughty, Unionist, replacing
3 August: Launceston - J Fletcher Moulton QC, Liberal, replacing
 7 September: Down North - John Blakiston-Houston, Conservative, replacing
17 September: Darlington - Herbert Pike Pease, Unionist, replacing
20 October: Ormskirk - Hon Arthur Stanley, Conservative, replacing Arthur Bower Forwood
1 November: North Fermanagh - Edward Mervyn Archdale, Conservative, replacing Richard Martin Dane
9 December: Liverpool Kirkdale - David MacIver, Conservative, replacing

1899
 6 January: Aylesbury - Hon Lionel Walter Rothschild, Unionist, replacing Baron Ferdinand de Rothschild
16 January: Newton - Lt Col Richard Pilkington, Conservative, replacing
23 January: Epsom - William Keswick, Conservative, replacing
14 February: Birmingham North - John Throgmorton Middlemore, Unionist, replacing William Kenrick
16 February: Londonderry - Count Arthur Moore, Anti-Parnellite, replacing Edmund Vesey Knox
21 February: Lanarkshire North West - Charles Mackinnon Douglas, Liberal, replacing John Goundry Holburn
23 February: Rotherham - William Henry Holland, Liberal, replacing
25 February: Antrim North - William Moore, Unionist, replacing Hugh McCalmont
 March: Hythe - Sir Edward Albert Sassoon Bt, Conservative, replacing
8 March: Elland - Charles Philips Trevelyan, Liberal, replacing
16 March: Norfolk North - Sir William Brampton Gurdon KCMG, Liberal, replacing Herbert Cozens-Hardy (appointed to bench)
5 April: Harrow - Irwin Cox, Conservative, replacing William Ambrose
2 May: Merionethshire - Prof Owen Morgan Edwards, Liberal, replacing
11 May: Oxford University - Sir William Reynell Anson Bt, Unionist, replacing
30 May: Southport - Sir George Augustus Pilkington, Liberal, replacing
20 June: Edinburgh South - Arthur Dewar, Liberal, replacing Robert Cox
23 June: Edinburgh East - George McCrae, Liberal, replacing Robert Wallace
5 July: Osgoldcross - Sir John Austin Bt, Liberal, replacing
6 July: Oldham - Alfred Emmott and Walter Runciman, Liberal, replacing Robert Ascroft and James Francis Oswald
12 July: St Pancras East - Thomas Wrightson, Conservative, replacing
27 October: Bow and Bromley - Walter Murray Guthrie, Conservative, replacing Lionel Holland
6 November: Exeter - Sir Edgar Vincent KCMG, Conservative, replacing
1899: Clackmannan and Kinross-shires- Eugene Wason, replacing John Balfour, Liberal
1899: Wells -
1899: Mayo South -

incomplete for 1899 and 1900

Sources

Whitaker's Almanac 1900

See also
List of parliaments of the United Kingdom
UK general election, 1895

1895
 List
UK MPs
1895 United Kingdom general election